Chris Barfoot (born Christopher John Barfoot, 7 September 1966) is a British actor, writer/director and producer of film productions.

Biography
Barfoot and Clother received an ‘Honorable mention’ at the Dragon Con film festival for The Reckoningin 2003. The Reckoning also won Sky Movies Top Ten Short Films of All Time with Richard Jobson. The film was broadcast by NBC Universal's Sci Fi Channel until 2008, where it received their highest viewing figures of all time.

In 2006, Barfoot won First Place at the Dragon Con film festival for Helix starring Prunella Scales and Robert Pulvertaft.

Barfoot is a former full voting member of BAFTA (British Academy of Film and Television Arts), his fiancee is Cheryl Richmond, he has one daughter (Bianca), two grandchildren (Taylor and Finn) and three stepchildren (Jack, Rachael and Louise).

References

External links

Filmography
'Short films:PhoenixHellionDead CleanReckoning''

1966 births
Living people
British film directors
People from Swanmore